Hands of Ash is the sixth studio album by Trust Obey, released on July 23, 1996 by Fifth Colvmn Records.

Reception
Aiding & Abetting commended Hands of Ash for being "Gothic in the sense of spartan arrangements and black overtones" and that "the production is quite good, leaving just enough of a dull edge on the sound to create an ominous feel." Sonic Boom said "The real potential of this project lies in its DIY production and denial to bend to the will of a producer in its final mastering" and "this album is something any fan of slow, harsh and rumbling ambience will enjoy."

Track listing

Personnel
Adapted from the Hands of Ash liner notes.

Trust Obey
 John Bergin – vocals, guitar, bass guitar, keyboards, programming, production, mixing, engineering, editing, cover art, photography, design, voice (1)
 Brett Smith – guitar, engineering, voice (1), horn and snare drum (7)

Additional performers
 David Chapman – voice (1), trumpet (4)

Production and design
 Bart Biechele – recording, voice (1)
 Mike Miller – engineering, editing

Release history

References

External links 
 
 Hands of Ash at Bandcamp
 Hands of Ash at iTunes

1996 albums
Fifth Colvmn Records albums
Trust Obey albums